The Metropolitan Archdiocese of Vrhbosna (also known as the Metropolitan Archdiocese of Sarajevo) is an ecclesiastical archdiocese of the Catholic Church. Its territorial remit includes the eastern  parts of Bosnia and Herzegovina and the entirety of the Republic of North Macedonia. Its episcopal see is the city of Sarajevo (Vrhbosna), the capital of Bosnia and Herzegovina. The archdiocese has the following suffragans: in North Macedonia the Diocese of Skopje; in Bosnia, the dioceses of Banja Luka, Mostar-Duvno and Trebinje-Mrkan.

Vrhbosna's cathedral is the Cathedral of the Sacred Heart in Sarajevo. Tomo Vukšić currently serves as the archbishop of the archdiocese.

History 

The Diocese of Bosnia (Latin: Dioecesis Bosniensis) existed in Bosnia between the 11th and 15th centuries, and remained as a single title until 1773 when it was given to the Bishop of Sirmia.

It is not known precisely when the Bosnian diocese was established. Based on a collection of historical documents Provinciale Vetus, published in 1188, which mention it twice, once subordinated to the Archdiocese of Split, and another time under the Archdiocese of Ragusa, it is assumed that it came into existence between 1060 and 1075. During the 12th century, it was contested between those two archdioceses as well as another two, the Archdiocese of Antivari and the Archdiocese of Kalocsa. In 1244, an endowment of the parishes of Đakovo and Blezna by King Bela IV of Hungary listed the other parishes of the diocese, namely Vrhbosna, Neretva, Lepenica, Vidgossa (Viduša), Mile (near today's Visoko), Lašva, Uskoplje, Brod (near today's Zenica), Borač (near today's Rogatica).

In the 13th and 14th centuries, the Bishops of Bosnia were mainly Dominican missionaries who were sent in to combat the spread of the Bosnian Church. At the turn of the 14th century, the Franciscans also arrived with the same purpose, at first in Usora and Soli, at the request of Stephen Dragutin of Serbia. The two orders engaged in a prolonged dispute over the control of the province, in which the Franciscans ultimately prevailed, yet the weakened diocese still succumbed to the Ottoman conquest of Bosnia in 1463.

During the Ottoman occupation, the bishop of Bosnia had no effective control over the territory of Bosnia, rather, the Franciscan Province of Bosna Srebrena remained the primary vessel of Catholicism in the area. In 1735, the Holy See founded the Apostolic Vicariate for Bosnia, and assigned Franciscans as apostolic vicars to direct it, thereby formally ending the jurisdiction of this diocese over Bosnia.

In 1773, pope Clement XIV united formally the diocese with the Diocese of Syrmia on demand of the Holy Roman Empress and Queen of Hungary and Croatia, Maria Theresa. The 1773 change subordinated it to the Archdiocese of Zagreb. In 1881, the Archdiocese of Vrhbosna was erected, that included the actual territory of Bosnia.
The Diocese of Bosnia (Ðakovo) and Srijem became the present-day Archdiocese of Ðakovo-Osijek.

On 5 July 1881, Pope Leo XIII issued Ex hac augusta Principis Apostolorum cathedra, a bull by which he restored the regular Church hierarchy in Bosnia and Herzegovina. With the restoration, both vicariates, the Bosnian (1735–1881) and the Herzegovinian (1846–81) were abolished.

The old Diocase of Bosnia was elevated as the Archdiocese of Vrhbosna. The pope subordinated to it three other dioceses: the newly established Diocese of Banja Luka, the already existing Diocese of Trebinje-Mrkan (under the apostolic administration from the bishop of Dubrovnik at the time) and the Diocese of Mostar-Duvno, to which he added the title of bishop of Duvno as well. The Diocese of Mostar-Duvno encompassed the territory of the Apostolic Vicariate of Herzegovina, which was abolished.

The Apostolic Vicar of Bosnia Paškal Vuičić was simply retired after the abolishment of the vicariate, while the Apostolic Vicar of Herzegovina Paškal Buconjić was appointed Bishop of Mostar-Duvno. Josip Stadler was appointed the Archbishop of Vrhbosna and Administrator of Banja Luka.

The Bosnian War, which resulted in the Siege of Sarajevo on the archdiocese's home, gravely impacted the archdiocese. In the war's aftermath, repairs had to be completed to many damaged churches and chapels. The biggest struggle has been the exodus of Croats, causing the Catholic population in the diocese to drop to less than half of what it was before the conflict.

Ordinaries

Tomo Vukšić

Auxiliary Bishops of Vrhbosna

Administrative division

Saints, Blesseds & Venerables of Vrhbosna 
Drina Martyrs - the professed Sisters of the Congregation of the Daughters of Divine Charity, murdered because of their faith in Bosnia and Hercegovina between December 15 and 23, 1941.
Josip Stadler, Servant of God - the first modern archbishop of Vrhbosna and the founder of the religious order of the Servants of the Infant Jesus. The process for his canonization began in Sarajevo on June 20, 2002.
Petar Barbarić, Servant of God - Jesuit seminarian

See also

Drina Martyrs
Roman Catholicism in Bosnia and Herzegovina

References

Sources

External links
 

Dioceses established in the 11th century
Religion in medieval Bosnia and Herzegovina
 
Vrhbosna
Vrhbosna
Religion in Bosnia and Herzegovina during Ottoman period